is a role-playing game which was developed and published by SNK Playmore for the Nintendo DS video game console. The game was released in 2008 in Japan.

Kimino Yusha was unveiled at the 2007 Tokyo Game Show, but very few websites reported of the game's unveiling, they only posted screenshots and videos seemingly out of the blue.

Kimino Yusha is designed for people who don't have a lot of time to play RPGs, and is said to promise large-scale adventures that can be played in 30 minutes. There are about 24 chapters and each chapter will only take about 30 minutes to complete, thus making it consistent and short at the same time. The battles in the game use both screens.

The character designs in the game highly resemble the ones used in a fellow SNK Playmore series called Doki Doki Majo Shinpan!.

References

External links
IGN: Kimi no Yusha
Kimi no Yuusha for DS - Kimi no Yuusha Nintendo DS
SNK PLAYMORE USA OFFICIAL WEBSITE
SNK PLAYMORE OFFICIAL HOMEPAGE
Kimi no Yusha OFFICIAL HOMEPAGE

2008 video games
Japan-exclusive video games
Nintendo DS games
Nintendo DS-only games
Role-playing video games
SNK Playmore games
Video games developed in Japan